Nicola Cuomo (Andria (BA), 1946- 2016) was an Italian educator and Professor of Special Education Inclusion at the University of Bologna. Since 1974 he has conducted research on the difficulties of learning and teaching and on reducing the impact of disability with particular reference to Down syndrome, fragile X syndrome and autism. Resulting from thirty years of systemic research he has developed a didactic method known as "Emotion to Know" which is based on the theories of Vygotsky, Wertheimer and Husserl. The method is based on the premise that a person with a disability should as much as possible lead a life that takes into account their own originality and resources in developing an intentional consciousness, independent living, and independent path in a global, active, lived and acted way.

Emotion to Know 

The method involved in "Emotion to Know" does not frame learning in fragmented exercises, but rather in complex and articulated activities, with a strong association at an affective level, involving more concepts, more competences, and more abilities that are not only potential, but realized. The ways of knowing, the experiences, the education, the knowledge, and the didactics are not presented in a superficial and linear way like the shot of a gun, but are systemic, contextualised, articulated, and complex like the flight of a butterfly. It is an educational and didactic method that does not place experiences, learning, and notions in a superficial rational relation, but rather into a psycho-affective-relational one where learning is essentially a qualitative maturation of the experience, specifically designed to arouse the emotion to know and desire to exist including the competences to solve new and unexpected problems.

Interventions in Special Education characterised by the Emotion to Know method aim to link learning to the consciousness and to discover the power of one's own body, through which it is possible to operate on objects, on others, and on the world. It is the power of being able to act and to want to act; to provoke a permanent and dynamic passage in a context of reciprocity, from person to person.

Without these deep emotional attentions and/or preliminary strategies it often gets difficult to involve a person with a disability, because having as reference RATIONALITY and MOTIVATIONS in order to involve him/her in a project is frequently very difficult or impossible: these are sometimes absent. Therefore, it is essential to create the conditions for success, as it is from this success that the motivations derive. The possibilities of success have to be researched in those fields in which the person with the disability demonstrates even only minimal practical competences.

The stringency and at the same time the flexibility of the Emotion to Know method, including actively involving children and people with disabilities in planning processes, making them active participants of the learning process, aims to ensure that the child / person acquires the ability to solve problems and to transfer what they have learned to new and unknown situations. Errors, therefore, also become part of the learning process. Consistent with Gestalt guidelines, the Emotion to Know method proposes respect for diversity and originality considering each of them as resources, and finding the educator in the role of the solicitor and provoker of opportunities rather than a mere transmitter of knowledge and pre-packaged and pre-planned content.

The main research method to validate the effects of these projects of integration is action research.

A detailed description of 'Emotion to Know' in both English and Italian will be available in a special issue of the International Journal of Whole Schooling due for publication in late 2011. Further information in Italian can be found by following the links listed below. The method was portrayed in the magazine "behinderte menschen" (3/2019).

References 

N. Cuomo, A. Imola, Cuestionamos las experiencias, «REVISTA DE EDUCACIÓN ESPECIAL», 2008, 1, pp. 49 – 58 [articolo]

N. Cuomo, La lettera come strumento di lavoro, «L' EMOZIONE DI CONOSCERE E IL DESIDERIO DI ESISTERE», 2008, 3, pp. 41 – 47 [articolo]

N. Cuomo, La storia di R. Una risposta, un'esperienza da interrogare (II Parte), «L' EMOZIONE DI CONOSCERE E IL DESIDERIO DI ESISTERE», 2008, 3, pp. 20 – 27 [articolo]

N. Cuomo, La storia di R. Un'esperienza da interrogare (I Parte), «L' EMOZIONE DI CONOSCERE E IL DESIDERIO DI ESISTERE», 2008, 2, pp. 17 – 25 [articolo]

N. Cuomo, Le emozioni, la ricerca, la pedagogia speciale, «L' EMOZIONE DI CONOSCERE E IL DESIDERIO DI ESISTERE», 2007, 1, pp. 1 – 5 [articolo]

N. Cuomo, Lettera: uno strumento di lavoro, «L' EMOZIONE DI CONOSCERE E IL DESIDERIO DI ESISTERE», 2007, 1, pp. 14 – 19 [articolo]

N. Cuomo, L'insegnamento della scrittura e della lettura, «L' EMOZIONE DI CONOSCERE E IL DESIDERIO DI ESISTERE», 2007, 1, pp. 11 – 13 [articolo]

N. Cuomo, C. De Pellegrin, Rifettiamo sullo sviluppo e gli apprendimendi, «L' EMOZIONE DI CONOSCERE E IL DESIDERIO DI ESISTERE», 2007, 1, pp. 6 – 10 [articolo]

Nicola Cuomo, Verso una scuola dell'emozione di conoscere - Il futuro insegnante, insegnante del futuro, PISA, Edizioni ETS, 2007, pp. 130 (Emozione di Conoscere). [libro]

Nicola Cuomo, Come superare un handicap, «INCHIESTA», 2006, 151, pp. 66 – 71 [articolo]

N. Cuomo, Interroghiamo le esperienze. Alla ricerca di buone prassi per il superamento degli handicap, «INFANZIA», 2006, 1(12), pp. 21 – 27 [articolo]

N.Cuomo, E. Bacciaglia, I modi dell'insegnare: tra il dire e il fare ...., tra le buone prassi e le cattive abitudini, CESENA, AEMOCON, 2005, pp. 314 (AEMOCON). [libro]

CUOMO N., L'Altra faccia del Diavolo Aprendere e insegnare in stato di benessere: un atteggiamento speriemtale, CESENA, Cils, 2005, pp. 314 (AEMOCON). [libro]

Nicola Cuomo, L'emocio de coneixer i el desig d'existir, «SUPORTS», 2005, Vol.9 - Num.1, pp. 17 – 22 [articolo]

Nicola Cuomo, Cinzia De Pellegrin, Un projecte de vida independent: un projecte per a la qualitat de vida, «SUPORTS», 2005, Volume 9 Num.1, pp. 6 – 16 [articolo]

A. KUMMER WYSS, P. WALTHER-MULLER; N. CUOMO, Didaktische Orienterungen in: Integration:Anspruch und Wirklichkeit, in:, Schweizer Heilpadagogik Kongress, BERNA, SZH CSPS, 2004, pp. 57 – 66 (atti di: Schweizer Heilpadagogik Kongress, Berna, 18–20 September 2003) [atti di convegno-relazione]

M. DE CARLO-BONVIN; CUOMO N., L'Emozione di Conoscere e il Desiderio di Esistere- Surmonter son appréhension face aux nouveautés in: Au seuil d'une école pour tous Réflexions, expériences et enjeux de l'intégration des élèves en situation de handicap, in:, Au seuil d'une école pour tous, BERNA, Edition SZH/CSPS, 2004, pp. 79 – 87 (atti di: Congrès suisse de pédagogie spécialisée organisé par le Centre suisse de pédagogie spécialisée, Svizzera, Berna 18/20 Settembre 2003) [atti di convegno-relazione]

N.CUOMO, Uno Strumento di lavoro. La "Lettera", in: COLLANA A CURA DI GIORGIO CIAN E DIEGA ORLANDO, - Rivista per la formazione nelle professioni educative- "Disabilità Integrazione e Pedagogia Speciale " Coordimamento di: Ferdinando Montuschi e Roberta Caldin, MILANO, CEDAM, 2004, pp. 608 – 618 (Studium Educazionis) [capitolo di libro]

Cuomo, N. (1989). "Schwere Behinderungen" in der Schule. Bad Heilbrunn: Julius Klinkhardt. [book]

External links 
  - Emotion to Know Journal site including research links (in Italian)
  - Emotion to Know Associacion site - in italian

  - Arianna's thread (Fragile X - In Italian)
  - Professor Cuomo's personal site, University of Bologna
  - Dialogue on Emotion to Know (in Italian)
  - Puglia Fragile X association (in Italian)
  - Information on prof. Cuomo and brief bibliography (in Italian)
  - Die Methode "Empathie und Verstehen". German version of Cuomo's systemic concept "l'emozione di conoscere e il desiderio di esistere"

Living people
1946 births
Italian educators
Disability studies academics
Academic staff of the University of Bologna
Place of birth missing (living people)